State Highway 40 (SH-40) is a  state highway in Bannock County, Idaho, United States, that serves the city of Downey. The highway travels due east from an interchange with Interstate 15 (I-15) to an intersection with U.S. Route 91 (US-91) in Downey.

Route description

From its western terminus SH-40, known locally as Woodland Road, travels due east towards Downey and immediately passes the just north of the Flags West Truck Stop.

About  along its course through agricultural area, SH-40 has an intersection with two dirt roads, South Race Track Road (which heads north) and South Olson Road (which heads south). Just beyond the intersection SH-40 passes along the north side of an Idaho Transportation Department  (ITD) maintenance yard. The highway then connects with the north end of Barnes Lane (a short gravel road. A little farther on, SH-40 finally enters the city limits of Downey, just before reaching its eastern terminus at a T Intersection with US-91. (Two sets of Union Pacific Railroad tracks run along the east side of US-91 though Downey.)

Traffic
Every year, the ITD conducts a series of surveys on its highways in the state to measure traffic volume. This is expressed in terms of average annual daily traffic (AADT), which is a measure of traffic volume for any average day of the year. In 2018, ITD calculated that 1,400 vehicles traveled the on highway. The lowest traffic section was the eastern end (from the intersection with South Race Track Road/South Olson Road to the US-91), which had an AADT of only 550 vehicles.

Major intersections

See also

 List of state highways in Idaho

References

External links

040
Transportation in Bannock County, Idaho